The Brooklyn Navy Yard (originally known as the New York Navy Yard) is a shipyard and industrial complex located in northwest Brooklyn in New York City, New York. The Navy Yard is located on the East River in Wallabout Bay, a semicircular bend of the river across from Corlears Hook in Manhattan. It is bounded by Navy Street to the west, Flushing Avenue to the south, Kent Avenue to the east, and the East River on the north.

The Brooklyn Navy Yard was established in 1801. From the early 1810s through the 1960s, it was an active shipyard for the United States Navy, and was also known as the United States Naval Shipyard, Brooklyn and New York Naval Shipyard at various points in its history. The Brooklyn Navy Yard produced wooden ships for the U.S. Navy through the 1870s, and steel ships after the American Civil War in the 1860s.

The efforts of its 75,000 workers during World War II earned the yard the nickname "The Can-Do Shipyard". The Navy Yard was deactivated as a military installation in 1966, but continued to be used by private industries. The facility now houses an industrial and commercial complex run by the New York City government, both related to shipping repairs and maintenance and as office and manufacturing space for non-maritime industries.

The Brooklyn Navy Yard includes dozens of structures, some of which date to the 19th century. The Brooklyn Naval Hospital, a medical complex on the east side of the Brooklyn Navy Yard site, served as the yard's hospital from 1838 until 1948. Dry Dock 1, one of six dry docks at the yard, was completed in 1851 and is listed as a New York City designated landmark. Former structures include Admiral's Row, a grouping of officers' residences at the west end of the yard, which was torn down in 2016 to accommodate new construction. Several new buildings were built in the late 20th and early 21st centuries as part of the city-run commercial and industrial complex. A commandant's residence, also a National Historic Landmark, is located away from the main navy yard's site. The FDNY's Marine Operations Division and their fireboats are located at Building 292.

History

Site 

The site of the Brooklyn Navy Yard was originally a mudflat and tidal marsh settled by the Canarsie Indians. The Dutch colonized the area in the early 17th century, and by 1637, Dutch settler Joris Jansen Rapelje purchased  of land around present-day Wallabout Bay from the Indians. The site later became his farm, though Rapelje himself did not reside on it until circa 1655. Rapelje was a Walloon from Belgium, and the area around his farm came to be known as "Waal-boght" or "Waal-bocht", which translates roughly into "Walloon's Bay"; this is probably where the name of Wallabout Bay was adapted from. The Rapelje family and their descendants had possession of the farm for at least a century afterward, and mostly farmed on the drained mudflats and tidal marshland. They built a grist mill and a mill pond on the site by 1710. The pond continued to be used through the 19th century. The Remsen family were the last descendants of the Rapeljes to own the farm, and they held possession of nearby land plots through the mid-19th century.

During the American Revolutionary War, the British held American prisoners of war on prison ships moored in the bay. Many of the prisoners died and were buried in trenches on nearby ground. Some 12,000 prisoners were said to have died by 1783, when the remaining prisoners were freed. The Prison Ship Martyrs' Monument in nearby Fort Greene was built to honor these casualties. In 1781, shipbuilder John Jackson and two of his brothers acquired different parts of the Rapelje estate. Jackson went on to create the neighborhood of Wallabout, as well as a shipbuilding facility on the site. The first ship that Jackson built at the site was the merchant ship Canton, which he built in the late 1790s.

Development and early years

Land purchase
The Jacksons put the land up for sale in 1800, and the federal government soon learned about the sale. Childs sold the site to the federal government 16 days later. The purchase was part of outgoing U.S. president John Adams's plans to establish a series of naval yards in the United States. This particular site was chosen because it was thought that the plot's location near Lower Manhattan and New York Harbor would be ideal for placing military defenses; however, this never came to fruition.

The property went unused for several years because Adams's successor Thomas Jefferson opposed military build-up. The Brooklyn Navy Yard became an active shipyard for the United States Navy in 1806, when the yard's first commandant Jonathan Thorn moved onto the premises. It took several decades before the Brooklyn Navy Yard was fully developed; for the most part, early development was focused around the western side of the current yard. It was around the same time that Quarters A, the federal-style commandant's house, was built at the northwestern corner of the Brooklyn Navy Yard. In 1810, the federal government acquired another  of land from the state of New York. Much of this land was underwater at high tide. During the War of 1812, the Brooklyn Navy Yard repaired and retrofitted more than 100 ships, although it was not yet used for shipbuilding.

Initial operations
Her keel was laid in 1817, and she was launched on May 30, 1820. The yard's first receiving ship, a type of ship used to house new recruits for the Navy, was Robert Fulton's steam frigate, . Fulton was initially called Demologos and was designed as a floating battery to protect the New York Harbor. However, the steamship was deemed inadequate for that purpose, and when Fulton died in 1815, the vessel was rechristened Fulton. Fulton then served as a receiving ship, moored off the shoreline of the Navy Yard until she was destroyed in an explosion on June 4, 1829.

By the 1820s, the Navy Yard consisted of the commandant's house, a marine barracks building, several smaller buildings, and shiphouses on what is now the northwestern corner of the yard. Of these, the commandant's house is the only remaining structure. The Navy acquired an additional  from Sarah Schenck in 1824, on which it built the Brooklyn Naval Hospital. The same year, it was converted into a "first-class" yard. The hospital opened in 1838. During the Great Fire of New York on December 16, 1835, the Navy Yard  sent a detachment of U.S. Marines and sailors to help fight the fire, which had quickly consumed much of which is now the Financial District. The detachment detonated buildings in the fire's path, which created fire breaks and reduced the fire's ability to spread, leading The Long Island Star to report that the "detachment of marines from the navy yard under Lieutenant Reynolds and sailors under Captain Mix rendered the most valuable service..." Similarly. during the Great Fire in Lower Manhattan on July 19, 1845, "a detachment of sailors and marines from the navy yard under Captain Hudson, were present, and did good service. The USS North Carolina which was acting as a receiving ship for new enlisted men, also sent her sailors in boats for shore duty." The Navy Yard also sent materials for blowing up buildings and creating firebreaks.

Admiral Matthew C. Perry arrived at the Brooklyn Navy Yard in 1831, and was commandant from 1841 to 1843. Perry helped found the United States Naval Lyceum at the Navy Yard in 1833. Its first president was Charles G. Ridgeley. The Lyceum, which was housed in a handsome brick building, published several magazines and maintained a museum of documents from around the world. Its membership included junior officers, lieutenants, midshipmen, and several U.S. presidents. When the Lyceum disbanded in 1889, its documents and artifacts were transferred to the U.S. Naval Academy Museum in Maryland, and the museum building was demolished. In addition, when the U.S. Navy's first steam warship Fulton II was built at the Brooklyn Navy Yard in 1837, Perry helped supervise the vessel's construction, and he later became her first commander. Perry was also present during the construction of Dry Dock A, but he left his position as commandant of the Brooklyn Navy Yard in 1843.

Early civilian employees
Early Brooklyn Navy Yard mechanics and laborers were per diem employees, paid by the day. As per diem employees they were rarely in a position to negotiate wages. Commodore Isaac Chauncey writing to the Secretary of the Navy Robert Smith on January 5, 1808, declared "I however was able to find a sufficient number willing to work at the reduced wages and these who refused will in a week come back and beg for work and I shall be able to reduce their wages 25 cents more for the merchants have no work for them to do, therefore,  they must either work for us at our price or go unemployed to induce the merchants to believe the government is not fully determined to build the twenty three Gun Boats at this place I have given out that they are to be built where they can be built cheapest..." Wages fluctuated significantly based on the congressional apportionment for that year. For example in May 1820, the Board of Navy Commissioners, directed Captain Samuel Evans, the pay of shipyard  carpenters  was to be reduced 1.62 1/2 cents per day to 1.25 per day, likewise laborers pay was reduced from 90 cents per day to 75.  The Brooklyn Navy Yard soon became a large employer because of the expansion of shipbuilding. 1835 was an important year for American labor, with workers in major Northeastern cities petitioning for higher wages; better working conditions, and a ten-hour workday. On  March 26, 1835, the mechanics in the New York Navy Yard petitioned the Board of Navy Commissioners to reduce the workday to ten hours, which was "signed by one thousand citizens of New York and Brooklyn." On April 24, 1835, the Board, rejected their petition, because "it would be inconsistent with the public interests, to regulate the working hours in the Navy Yards as proposed in the memorial". The ten-hour workday would not be implemented until March 31, 1840, when President Martin Van Buren finally mandated a ten-hour workday for all mechanics and laborers employed on public works." In 1848, the yard had 441 employees who typically worked a ten hour day, six days a week.

Creation of street grid 
In 1826, the United States Congress required all of the United States' naval yards to procure a master plan for future development. Because of various issues such as the muddy geography, the narrowness of the nearby shipping channel, the Brooklyn Navy Yard's small size, and the density of existing development in the surrounding area, the Navy was unable to submit a feasible master plan for the yard.

The engineer Loammi Baldwin Jr. was hired to create a design for building a dry dock at the yard in 1825. Baldwin's plan, published in 1826, created a street grid system for the Brooklyn Navy Yard. Two other dry docks were designed: Drydock One at the Boston Navy Yard, and Drydock One at the Norfolk Naval Shipyard. Because of a lack of funds, construction of the Brooklyn Navy Yard's dock was delayed until 1836, when the two other dry docks were completed. Construction on the dry dock started in 1841, and it was completed in 1851. In the mid-19th century, the boundaries of Wallabout Creek were placed in a channel, and the creek was dredged, contributing to the surrounding area's development as an industrial shipyard.

Mid- and late 19th century

Civil War 
By 1860, just before the American Civil War, many European immigrants had moved to Brooklyn, which had become one of the largest cities in the United States (it was not part of New York City until 1898). The yard had expanded to employ thousand of skilled mechanics with men working around the clock. At the start of the war, in 1861, the Brooklyn Navy Yard had 3,700 workers.  The navy yard station logs for January 17, 1863, reflected 3,933 workers on the payroll. The yard employed 6,200 men by the end of the war in 1865.

During the Civil War, the Brooklyn Navy Yard manufactured 14 large vessels and retrofitted another 416 commercial vessels to support the Union's naval blockades against the Confederate Navy.  was rumored to have been retrofitted within less than 24 hours. For three months following President Lincoln's "75,000 volunteers" proclamation in April 1861, the Navy Yard was busy placing weapons and armaments on vessels, or refurbishing existing weapons and armaments. In an article published that July, The New York Times stated, "For several weeks hands have been kept at work incessantly, often at night and on the Sabbath." The screw steam sloop , launched on November 20, 1861, was the first vessel built at the Navy Yard that was specifically intended for the American Civil War. She participated in the Battle of Forts Jackson and St. Philip in 1862, and in the Battle of Mobile Bay in 1864. Later that year she fought  (originally ) at the Battle of Hampton Roads.

Because of the Navy Yard's role in creating ships for Union blockades of the Confederacy, it was a target for Confederate supporters, who would attempt to ignite the yard's storage facilities. After the Union Navy quickly realized the plot, it mobilized sailors and Brooklyn metropolitan police to keep watch around the yard, and the Confederates never tried to mount a real attack.

After the Civil War 

In 1866, following the end of the Civil War, there was a large decrease in the number of people working at the Brooklyn Navy Yard, although the yard continued to finish off the vessels that were already under construction. Shipbuilding methods had improved greatly during the war's duration, and the shipbuilding technology that the Navy used was now obsolete; this was compounded by a series of other problems that the Navy faced in general, such as corruption. Likely as a result, the Brooklyn Navy Yard did not start construction on any vessels between 1866 and 1872. By the late 1860s and early 1870s, the Navy Yard was creating steel steam vessels, as they were faster and easier to maneuver compared to wooden vessels. An iron plating shop had been constructed for the construction of such vessels. , launched in 1876, was the final wooden vessel with sails that was constructed at the Brooklyn Navy Yard. During the late 19th century, there were calls to close the shipyard permanently, although these never came to fruition.

By 1872, there were 1,200 people on the Brooklyn Navy Yard's payroll, a number that could be increased fourfold in case of war. Workers at the Brooklyn Navy Yard, who were employees of the federal government, received employment protections that were considered novel at the time. For instance, an act passed in 1867 protected Navy Yard employees' rights to political free speech, and an act passed in 1872 restricted laborers, mechanics, and workmen from working more than eight hours per day.

By the end of the 1880s, the shipbuilding industry at Brooklyn Navy Yard was active again, as the Navy started expanding its fleet. The Navy Yard created larger battleships, as well as torpedo boats and submarines, and many of the vessels launched from the yard featured modern ordnance, propulsion systems, navigation, and armor. The new construction required expanded shipways for launching ships. Since 1820, the Brooklyn Navy Yard had used wooden slipways, with wooden ship houses above each slipway, which protected the wooden ships' hulls, but in the 1880s, these slipways were updated with granite girders.

The Navy also constructed two additional dry docks, both of which soon encountered problems. Dry Dock 2, originally a timber dry dock, was built in 1887 and soon encountered problems due to its poor construction quality. Dry Dock 2 collapsed in a severe storm in July 1899 and was rebuilt in masonry in 1901. Dry Dock 3, a timber dock, was similar in design to Dry Dock 2. It started construction in 1893 and was completed in 1897. Shortly afterward, Dry Dock 3 was found to be too short by four inches and too shallow by two feet, so it was fixed. The initial timber construction of Dry Docks 2 and 3 required a large maintenance cost, unlike for the masonry Dry Dock 1, which had required only one reconstruction in 40 years. Both dry docks still exist, but are now inactive. To support the additional dry docks and shipway capacity, several structures such as large machine shops, an administration building, and a pattern building were constructed in the 1890s.

Unlike other U.S. Navy shipyards at this time, the Brooklyn Navy Yard was very active in shipbuilding. Maine keel was laid in 1888, launched in 1895, and destroyed in Cuba's Havana Harbor in 1898.

The Brooklyn Navy Yard required large quantities of national flags, naval pennants and canvas gunpowder bags. The task of sewing these materials had historically been performed by men, but the yard began hiring women for the task due to a need for skilled labor. By the late 1890s, many of the yard's newly hired flag makers were women, and most of these women were widows of soldiers killed in war. The flag makers, working up to 14 hours a day, had to sew 30 to 40 flags per ship. One of these women was Mary Ann Woods, a seamstress flag maker first class who was hired in 1882 and promoted to "Quarterwoman Flag Maker" in 1898.

20th-century operations

1900s and 1910s 

After Brooklyn was annexed to New York City in 1898, it experienced rapid development, including the construction of the Williamsburg and Manhattan Bridges to Manhattan, as well as the first New York City Subway lines, which were constructed by the Interborough Rapid Transit Company. The Brooklyn Navy Yard benefited from this, as it was very close to the Manhattan Bridge, and residents of Manhattan could easily access the Navy Yard. There was a large labor force, which was mainly composed of immigrants who had recently come to New York City through Ellis Island. Around this time, there was a proposal to move the Navy Yard to Communipaw, New Jersey, or simply close the yard altogether, but it did not succeed.

After the U.S. won the Spanish–American War of 1898, President Theodore Roosevelt, a former assistant secretary of the Navy, built up Navy presence. As such he arranged to build sixteen ships for a "goodwill tour" of the world. The main ship, was laid down at the Brooklyn Navy Yard in 1903 and launched in 1904; she was also the flagship vessel of the s. To accommodate the construction of Connecticut, Building Way 1 was rebuilt in 1903. Another slipway, Building Way 2, was built in 1917, at the same time that Building Way 1 was enlarged. Building Ways 1 and 2 were collectively referred to as the Connecticut building ways. The shipways were used to launch dreadnoughts, large battleships with heavy guns. By this time, all vessels at Brooklyn Navy Yard were constructed outdoors, rather than inside shipbuilding houses, as it was easier for overhead cranes.

During this time, the waterfront was rebuilt. During construction, serious problems with quicksand ultimately killed 20 workers and injured 400 others. After the project was abandoned by five different private builders, the federal government intervened to complete Dry Dock 4, which became known as the "Hoodoo" dock. A paymasters' office, a construction and repair shop/storehouse, and a locomotive shed for the Navy Yard's now-defunct railroad system were also constructed. By 1914, the Navy Yard comprised a  area.

Although World War I started in 1914, it had gone on for several years without American intervention prior to the American entry into World War I on April 6, 1917. The Brooklyn Navy Yard's workforce of 6,000 grew to 18,000 within a year, and a temporary camp was erected outside the Navy Yard's grounds. In preparation for the war, ID cards were issued to Navy Yard employees to prevent against sabotage, and Liberty Loan Rallies were held at the Navy Yard's boat shop. The Secretary of the U.S. Navy, Josephus Daniels, argued that the Brooklyn Navy Yard had to be expanded even further to the west to allow for more shipbuilding activities. In the meantime, non-essential activities were moved to the Bush Terminal in Sunset Park, Brooklyn. Several new buildings were built in response to the U.S.'s entry into World War I, including a locomotive roundhouse, supply storehouse, boat shed, structural shop, and light machine shop, as well as Pier C and Machine Way 2. Most of these structures were connected to the four dry docks and two shipways via the Brooklyn Navy Yard's railroad system. By the end of 1918, the U.S. government had made $40 million of investment into the Navy Yard to date.

During World War I, the six naval shipyards at Brooklyn, Boston, Charleston (South Carolina), Norfolk, Portsmouth (Maine), and Philadelphia started specializing in the construction of different vessel types for the war effort. The Brooklyn Navy Yard specialized in creating submarine chasers, manufacturing 49 of them in the span of eighteen months. World War I ended in 1919, and in the aftermath of the war, Tennessee was the last World War I battleship constructed at the Brooklyn Navy Yard. No new vessels were completed for ten years until  in 1929.

1920s and 1930s 

In 1920, after World War I ended, the Brooklyn Navy Yard started constructing South Dakota and Indiana, both of them s. The Washington Naval Treaty of 1921–1922, a peace treaty between the United States and four other countries, limited the signatories' construction of battleships, battlecruisers, and aircraft carriers. As a result, there was no need to continue constructing South Dakota and Indiana, nor to continue employing the shipbuilders who were working on these boats. Starting in 1921, large numbers of Navy Yard workers were fired, and by December 1921, 10,000 workers had been fired. Work on the partially completed South Dakota and Indiana was halted in February 1922, and both vessels were ordered to be scrapped. Congress did not allocate funding for the construction of any other ships. As such, until 1929, the workers who remained were tasked mostly with repairing ships at the dry docks.

Pensacola, one of eight "treaty ships" authorized in 1924 after the Washington conference, was launched from the Brooklyn Navy Yard in April 1929. and she was completed and commissioned the next year. The completion of Pensacola occurred at the start of the Great Depression, and as a result, the workforce of 4,000 was reduced by one-quarter immediately afterward. Due to delays in the signing of the London Naval Treaty, as well as a two-year extension of the Washington treaty, the keel of the next ship, was not laid until 1931. However, the yard remained open for routine ship maintenance.

The election of President Franklin D. Roosevelt in 1933, combined with fraying relations with Germany, Italy, and Japan, resulted in a resumption of shipbuilding activities for the Brooklyn Navy Yard. , the lead ship of the s, was laid at the yard in March 1935. By the end of 1935, ten cruisers were being constructed. Dry Dock 4 was lengthened slightly to accommodate the keel-laying of the battleship  in 1937.

The new construction required extra workers. By 1935, the Brooklyn Navy Yard had 4,000 workers. All were well-paid, receiving six days' worth of salary for every five-day workweek, and civilians received sizable retirement funds based on the length of their service. The Brooklyn Navy Yard employed 8,200 men by mid-1936, of which 6,500 were constructing ships and 1,700 were hired through WPA programs. By 1938, the yard employed about 10,000 men, of whom one-third received salaries from the WPA. At the time, the surrounding neighborhood was run-down with various saloons and dilapidated houses, as described in the Works Progress Administration (WPA)'s 1939 Guide to New York City. It was hoped that the extra work would help rehabilitate the area. Workers erected a garbage incinerator, garage, a coal plant office, and a seawall; in addition, they paved the Navy Yard's roads and laid new railroad tracks.

World War II 

In preparation for World War II, the Brooklyn Navy Yard was extensively reconstructed. The new construction involved extensive landfilling operations, some of which yielded artifacts that were centuries old. In one instance, a Civil War-era prison brig was found eight feet underground, while in another, workers unearthed a skeleton thought to be from one of the prison ship martyrs.

The naval shipyards in Brooklyn and Philadelphia were designated for the construction of battleships. A second battleship, started construction at Brooklyn Navy Yard in 1939 and was completed in 1942. According to the National Park Service, the Brooklyn Navy Yard eventually constructed "three battleships, two floating workshops, eight tank landing ships, and countless barges and lighters". The yard also outfitted 250 ships for battle, as well as made repairs to 5,000 ships.

To accommodate the construction of the battleships, dry docks 5 and 6 were constructed. The Navy re-acquired  of land, which had been sold to New York City in the 1890s to create Wallabout Market. The original plans were to build the dry docks in Bayonne, New Jersey, but that location was unsuitable due to its proximity to a munitions arsenal, and the dry docks at Brooklyn Navy Yard were approved in 1941. Construction contracts were awarded in 1941. Several structures were demolished, including the market and the Cob Dock. The neighboring Kent Avenue basin on the east side of the site was also filled in. Dry Dock 5 was completed by 1942. The work also entailed the construction of piers J and K, as well as a  hammerhead crane at Pier G, added in 1943.

The Brooklyn Navy Yard was employing 18,000 workers in December 1941, just after the attack on Pearl Harbor. Following Pearl Harbor, the U.S. officially entered World War II and the number of employees at Brooklyn Navy Yard increased. By June 1942, more than 42,000 workers were employed. The Brooklyn Navy Yard started 24/7 operations, and three shifts of eight hours were implemented. In addition to shipbuilding, workers at the yard created uniforms and flags, as well as packaged food and combat provisions for sailors and soldiers. During the peak of World War II, the yard employed 75,000 people and had a payroll of $15 million per month. The yard was nicknamed "The Can-Do Shipyard" because of its massive output in constructing dozens of ships and replacing hundreds more. Up until the war ended in 1945, the U.S. Navy awarded the Brooklyn Navy Yard an "E" for Excellence award annually.

During World War II, the navy yard began to train and employ women and minority workers in positions formerly held by white men who had since joined the armed forces. The women mainly built ships, aircraft, and weapons, as well as communications equipment, small arms, and rubber goods.  Other women worked in the WAVES division where they operated communications equipment and decoded messages. There were 200 women employed at the Brooklyn Navy Yard by 1942. However, women working in the yard faced sex discrimination and a gender pay gap, which prevented them from advancing to higher-level positions, and many women held "helper" positions to the remaining skilled male workers. After the passage of the Fair Employment Practices Act of 1941, African Americans were also hired for trade work at the Brooklyn Navy Yard, a sector in which they previously had been banned from working. By January 1945, at peak employment, 4,657 women were working in skilled trades at the Brooklyn Navy Yard, such as pipe-fitters, electricians, welders, crane operators, truck drivers, and sheet metal workers. Another 2,300 women worked in administrative jobs. Combined, women made up 10% of the Navy Yard's workforce, though this was lower than the industry-wide female employment rate of 11.5%; minorities, mostly African Americans, made up 8% of the workforce. After the war, most of the women were terminated from their positions, and by 1946 the production workforce was composed entirely of men. The minority workforce continued to grow through the 1960s, when minorities made up a fifth of all workers at the Brooklyn Navy Yard.

The Navy constructed at least 18 buildings at the Brooklyn Navy Yard during World War II, using any available land. These structures included a materials testing laboratory, a foundry, two sub-assembly shops, an ordnance machine shop, and a building trades shop. They fabricated sections of the ships before the completed pieces were joined to the hull, which, along with the introduction of welding, allowed for increased efficiency in the shipbuilding process. Another large structure constructed at the Navy Yard was Building 77, a sixteen-story building that served as the yard headquarters, as well as storage space. In addition, a housing development was built exclusively for Navy Yard workers in Fort Greene, a neighborhood located immediately south of the Navy Yard. The development, the Fort Greene Houses, was completed in 1942. A motion picture exchange for armed forces was constructed at the eastern end of the Brooklyn Navy Yard, near the naval hospital, and served to restore, review, and distribute films for use by U.S. Navy troops around the world.

After World War II
In November 1945, the Brooklyn Navy Yard was formally renamed the "New York Naval Shipyard", per an order from the federal government. From the yard's establishment in 1801 until the name change, the yard had been officially named the "New York Navy Yard", but the public popularly referred to the yard as "Brooklyn Navy Yard", and the government called it "United States Naval Shipyard, Brooklyn". According to one naval officer, the name change was conducted because "it would lead to better efficiency".

Following the end of World War II in 1945, industrial demand in Brooklyn declined sharply, and many white families moved away from Brooklyn to suburbs on Long Island. Public housing developments were built around the New York Naval Shipyard. The construction of the elevated Brooklyn–Queens Expressway to the south further isolated the shipyard from the surrounding community, although the segment of the expressway near the navy yard did not open until 1960. The workforce was scaled down to approximately 10,000 people by the end of 1947. At the same time, the Navy was selling off unused fleet, and new contracts for Navy vessels were being awarded to private shipyards. The New York Naval Shipyard celebrated its 150th anniversary in 1951. By this time, the yard had mostly shifted to manufacturing aircraft carriers, three of which were under construction.

When the Korean War started in 1950, the New York Naval Shipyard temporarily became active again, and by 1953, the shipyard had 20,000 workers on its payroll. The yard started retrofitting aircraft carriers to accommodate jet aircraft. For instance, in 1952, the New York Naval Shipyard renovated the World War II-era  into the United States' first angled-deck aircraft carrier. Despite this increased activity, the New York Naval Shipyard lost about half of its workforce when Korean War hostilities ended in 1953.

The keel of Constellation was laid in 1957. Constellation was nearly complete when she was damaged in a large fire on December 19, 1960, killing 49 people and injuring another 323. This caused her commissioning to be delayed by several months, to October 1961. In addition to the damage suffered from the Constellation fire, the New York Naval Shipyard was gradually becoming technologically obsolete. Newer ships were too large to pass under the nearby Manhattan and Brooklyn Bridges, and so could not get to the yard. The number of workers at New York Naval Shipyard continued to decline, and in 1963, this attracted the attention of U.S. Senator Kenneth B. Keating, who attempted to preserve the 11,000 remaining jobs.

Closure
In 1963, Department of Defense Secretary Robert S. McNamara started studying the feasibility of closing redundant military installations, especially naval ship yards, in order to save money.  The Department of Defense announced in May 1964 that it was considering closing New York Naval Shipyard, as well as Fort Jay and the Brooklyn Army Terminal. Workers protested against the yard's proposed closure in Washington, D.C., as well as in Madison Square Garden. As a result of the shipyard's anticipated closure, new shipbuilding contracts were awarded to private shipbuilders rather than to the New York Naval Shipyard. In October 1964, after lobbying from yard workers and local politicians, the shipyard received several shipbuilding contracts; at the time, the number of employees was 9,100 and decreasing. However, the next month, McNamara announced that the New York Naval Shipyard would be one of nearly a hundred military installations that would be closed.

When the shipyard's closure was announced, it employed 10,600 civilian employees and 100 military personnel with an annual payroll of about $90 million. The closure was anticipated to save about $18.1 million annually. Many of the employees at New York Naval Shipyard were shipbuilders who were specially trained in that practice. Shipbuilders made a last-minute attempt to convince the Navy not to close the yard. Despite these attempts, in January 1965, officials announced that the yard's closure date was scheduled for June 30, 1966, and began laying off the remaining 9,500 workers. By the middle of the year, the New York Naval Shipyard only had 7,000 workers on payroll.

After the New York Naval Shipyard's closure was announced, several alternate uses were proposed, none of which were implemented. In early 1965, manufacturers started looking into the possibility of renting space at the yard. Seymour Melman, an engineering economist at the Columbia University's Graduate School of Engineering, devised a detailed plan for converting the Brooklyn Navy Yard into a commercial shipyard which could have saved most of the skilled shipyard jobs. The administration of Mayor Robert F. Wagner Jr. looked to the auto industry to build a car plant inside the yard. Yet another plan called for a federal prison to be built on the site.

The last Navy ships were commissioned at the yard in December 1965. The formal closure of the New York Naval Shipyard was marked by a ceremony on June 25, 1966, and the Navy decommissioned the yard on June 30. Many of the workers subsequently found other work at the Philadelphia Naval Shipyard or other locations.

Sale to city, commercial usage, and decline 

In February 1966, the federal government announced that the Brooklyn Navy Yard was eligible for around $10 million in aid to help convert the yard into an industrial park. The state's bipartisan congressional delegation began negotiations with the federal government to receive this aid. Soon afterward, the city announced plans to purchase the yard and convert it into an industrial complex, despite challenges from several federal agencies who also wanted to use parts of the yard. In July 1966, the city moved to purchase the Brooklyn Navy Yard.

The Johnson administration initially refused to sell the yard to the City of New York. The administration wanted to sell the yard at $55 million, while the city wanted a lower price. In May 1967, the federal government and city agreed on a sale price of $24 million. The Nixon administration, which took office in January 1969, was more amenable to selling the Brooklyn Navy Yard to the city, and offered to sell the yard at more than $1 million below the previously agreed sale price. The next month, ownership of the yard was transferred to the city. Final congressional agreement for the sale was given in November 1969, and the next month, the city received a formal contract to purchase the yard for $22.5 million. The city government made its first down payment for the property in June 1970.

First leases 

The Commerce Labor Industry Corporation of Kings (CLICK) had been established in 1966 as a nonprofit body to run the yard for the city. CLICK projected that it would create 30,000 to 40,000 jobs at the Brooklyn Navy Yard within ten years, which in turn was expected to revitalize Brooklyn's economy.  The first lease inside the yard was signed in May 1968, even before the sale to the city had been finalized. By early 1969, there were 300 people working at four companies within the yard, and more companies were moving in. The yard's tenants operated in a variety of industries, such as manufacturing and distribution.

The city gave CLICK control of the Navy Yard once the city's purchase of the yard had been finalized. However, CLICK and the city soon came to an impasse in which CLICK refused to allow the city to participate in the management of the Navy Yard. There were allegations that CLICK executives favored granting jobs to local residents, rather than helping businesses move into the yard. In 1971, The New York Times reported that CLICK was operating at a net loss, and that CLICK had created less than half of the jobs that were originally promised for the end of 1970. By December 1971, CLICK and the city had a management agreement. CLICK management was completely overhauled with a board of 37 nonpartisan directors who all agreed that CLICK would be a "unified, businesslike organization", rather than a group influenced by politics.

Employment peaks 
Seatrain Shipbuilding, which was wholly owned by Seatrain Lines, was established in 1968 and signed a lease at Brooklyn Navy Yard in 1969. The lease had a provision that Seatrain hire local workers whenever possible, Seatrain became one of the largest tenants at Brooklyn Navy Yard, with 2,700 employees by 1973, most of whom lived in Brooklyn. Seatrain planned to build five very large crude carriers (VLCCs) and seven container ships for Seatrain Lines. It eventually built four VLCCs, which were the largest ships ever to be built in the Brooklyn Navy Yard, as well as eight barges and one ice-breaker barge. Seatrain's first vessel, the turbo tanker Brooklyn, was launched in 1973. Coastal Dry Dock and Repair Corp. leased the three small dry docks and several buildings inside the yard from CLICK in 1972.  Coastal Dry Dock only repaired and converted US Navy vessels.

Seatrain temporarily fired 3,000 employees in 1974 due to the 1973 oil crisis, resulting in a steep decline in the number of people employed at the Brooklyn Navy Yard. Soon after, Seatrain began venturing out of the shipbuilding business.

Employment inside the yard peaked in 1978. By that point, CLICK was leasing space inside the Brooklyn Navy Yard to 38 tenants, who collectively employed 5,500 tenants and occupied  of space. The yard had another  of space, but only  was considered to be usable at the time. Total occupancy at the Brooklyn Navy Yard was at 97%, up from 50% in 1972.

Decline 

Despite the commercial success of the Brooklyn Navy Yard, the former shipyard was also beset by accusations of corruption and racketeering. Additionally, the introduction of large container ships, which were too big to access the Brooklyn Navy Yard, meant that potential tenants operated in New Jersey instead, which had been investing in container shipping terminals As a result, most of the 30,000 to 40,000 jobs never materialized.

Seatrain endured a $13.5 million financial loss in 1978 because of various strikes and a decline in demand for oil tankers. In January 1979, Seatrain Lines suddenly closed down. More than 1,300 employees were fired, and only 150 were retained to finish any remaining projects. This caused a sharp decrease in the number of employees at the yard, and after Seatrain's employees had been terminated, the Brooklyn Navy Yard employed 3,970 people. After Seatrain closed down, Coastal Dry Dock became the largest tenant in the yard, with 600 to 1,000 workers at any given time.

The New York City Comptroller, Harrison J. Goldin, published a report on his office's audit of Brooklyn Navy Yard operations in July 1980. He concluded that the yard had been the victim of "a combination of fraud, mismanagement and waste" because of unnecessary or high expenses incurred by CLICK employees. After Goldin's report was published, CLICK's director was forced to resign. In subsequent reports, Goldin found that contracts were poorly managed, and that the city was not getting rent money from the Brooklyn Navy Yard. The number of people working at the yard continued to decline, and by October 1980, the yard hired 2,900 people, of which nearly half worked at Coastal Dry Dock. The most optimistic estimates proposed that the Navy Yard would see 10,000 new jobs added if its redevelopment were to peak. Local residents expressed frustration about the lack of job creation in the Brooklyn Navy Yard, as well as concerns about CLICK's lack of transparency, since residents were prohibited from attending CLICK meetings. In addition, companies at the Navy Yard were accused of having exceedingly high job standards that disqualified most residents from positions at the yard. CLICK was replaced by the nonprofit Brooklyn Navy Yard Development Corporation in 1981.

Coastal Dry Dock filed for bankruptcy in May 1986, and closed the following year. With the loss of Coastal Dry Dock, Brooklyn Navy Yard's revenue decreased by more than half. By 1987, the Brooklyn Navy Yard Development Corporation failed in all attempts to lease any of the six dry docks and buildings to any shipbuilding or ship-repair company. However, the Navy Yard did have 83 tenants and 2,600 employees, who generated a combined $2.7 million per year for the yard. Another ship-repair company, Brooklyn Ship Repair, had a tentative contract to lease space at the Navy Yard, but withdrew in 1988. On the other hand, after a city bailout of the yard in 1986, the Brooklyn Navy Yard Development Corporation started making its first-ever profit.

Incinerator plan 
A garbage incinerator was proposed at Brooklyn Navy Yard as early as 1967. The city proposed that the incinerator double as a cogeneration plant, generating both heat and electricity from the burning of garbage, and supplying that heat and energy to utility company Consolidated Edison. The incinerator would not only reduce the amount of waste being placed in Fresh Kills Landfill on Staten Island and the Fountain Avenue Landfill in eastern Brooklyn, but would also generate electricity for the city. In 1976, Mayor Abraham Beame proposed building a combined incinerator and power plant at Brooklyn Navy Yard. A contract was awarded later that year, at which point it was estimated that the incinerator would cost $226 million to construct. A "temporary" cogeneration plant, which generated steam for the Navy Yard's tenants, opened in late 1982 as a stopgap until a permanent incinerator was built.

The project garnered large community opposition from the Latino and Hasidic Jewish residents of nearby Williamsburg. Mayor Ed Koch withdrew two contract offers in 1982 due to objections from comptroller Goldin, who stated that the health effects of the proposed plant would be detrimental to the community. In December 1984, the New York City Board of Estimate narrowly approved the installation of the proposed incinerator in Brooklyn Navy Yard, one of five sites to be built in the city in the coming years. However, the state refused to grant a permit for constructing the plant for several years, citing that the city had no recycling plan. The proposed incinerator was a key issue in the 1989 mayoral election because the Hasidic Jewish residents of Williamsburg who opposed the incinerator were also politically powerful. David Dinkins, who ultimately won the 1989 mayoral election, campaigned on the stance that the Brooklyn Navy Yard incinerator plan should be put on hold. The state denied a permit for the incinerator in 1989, stating that the city had no plan for reducing ash emissions from the plant.

Once elected, Dinkins took actions that indicated he would not oppose the construction of the incinerator. In 1993, the state reversed its previous decision and granted a permit. By then, Rudy Giuliani had been elected as mayor, and he was opposed to the construction of the incinerator, instead preferring that the city institute a recycling plan. In 1995, his administration delayed the incinerator's construction by three years while the city procured a new solid-waste management plan. In November of that year, community members filed a lawsuit to block the incinerator's construction. Further investigation of the incinerator's proposed site found toxic chemicals were present in such high levels that the site qualified for Superfund environmental cleanup. The next year, the city dropped plans for the construction of the incinerator altogether, instead focusing on expanding its recycling program and closing Fresh Kills Landfill.

Industrial redevelopment

1990s and 2000s

After the decline of shipbuilding at the Brooklyn Navy Yard, it became an area of private manufacturing and commercial activity, though a naval detachment remained at the Brooklyn Navy Yard until 1993. By the early 1990s, there was a large increase in the number of small businesses at the yard due to its proximity to Manhattan, as well as a large availability of space at a relatively low cost. The Navy Yard had 180 tenants who hired a combined 3,500 employees by 1991. The redevelopment of the Brooklyn Navy Yard and the Brooklyn Army Terminal spurred ideas for revitalizing Brooklyn's waterfront. Because of community opposition, a medical-waste treatment plant at the Navy Yard was not built.

In 1995, construction started on a new cogeneration plant, the first in the United States to be constructed through the specifications of the federal Clean Air Act. The new cogen facility, located at Building 41, was to replace the temporary facility as well as the existing oil boiler plants at the site. It was completed in 1996 and is operated by ConEdison. Also in 1996, the Brooklyn Navy Yard Development Corporation received $739,000 to study possible uses for the Navy Yard. Community leaders supported the construction of housing on the yard, while they opposed the construction of the proposed trash incinerator. The city started including the Navy Yard within its capital budget in 1997, taking over maintenance of the yard.

In April 1999, actor Robert De Niro and Miramax Films announced that they were studying the possibility of constructing a film studio at Brooklyn Navy Yard. However, the deal with De Niro's group fell through later that year, in part due to a lack of commitment. The city selected a new developer, Douglas C. Steiner, who signed a 70-year lease with the Brooklyn Navy Yard Development Corporation in October 1999. The proposal was initially controversial among the Hasidic Jewish population of the surrounding area, whose leaders objected that the film industry was too immodest for the Hasidic Jewish principles. Ultimately, Steiner Studios was built at a cost of $118 million and opened at the yard in 2004.

In early 2000, the New York City government launched a program called Digital NYC to convince technology companies to move to seven "technology districts" around the city, including Brooklyn Navy Yard. Initially, this effort was not successful, since no companies signed up to move to Brooklyn Navy Yard at first. The development would cost $71 million, to be paid for by investors, while the city would also spend $60 million to upgrade infrastructure in the area. At this time, there was a wall enclosing much of the Navy Yard, but this was going to be partially demolished as part of the upgrade. The former main gate at Sands Street, on the western side of the yard, was to be restored, and the New York City Police Department (NYPD)'s tow pound there would be relocated.

The city broke ground on the expansion in 2006. During renovations, planners consulted some of the 32,000 blueprints in the Navy Yard's archive, some of which dated back two centuries. By 2007, the Navy Yard had over 230 businesses in 40 buildings, with about 5,000 employees between them. At that point, the Bloomberg administration had already spent $30 million on renovations and was proposing to spend an additional $180 million, representing the Navy Yard's largest expansion since World War II. Although the Navy Yard had been 99% occupied for the previous five years, it faced a few setbacks, such as its long distance from the nearest subway stations. Further upgrades to the Brooklyn Navy Yard called for spending $250 million to add  of retail and manufacturing space as well as 1,500 jobs by 2009. As part of these upgrades, Admiral's Row was to be demolished and replaced with a supermarket and industrial tower, though a controversy developed over whether Admiral's Row should be preserved. There were about 40 preservation projects proposed for the Navy Yard by 2010, and the yard had a full-time archivist.

2010s 

In 2011, the Brooklyn Navy Yard Development Corporation began a large-scale program to develop the Navy Yard. As part of the corporation's long-range plan, it proposed to renovate the Green Manufacturing Center, Building 77, the Admiral's Row site, and the Brooklyn Naval Hospital. That November, the Brooklyn Navy Yard Center at BLDG 92, a museum dedicated to the yard's history and future, opened on Flushing Avenue.

By 2015, more than 330 businesses were located at the yard, collectively employing about 7,000 people. Brooklyn Grange Farms was operating a  commercial farm on top of Building 3. Steiner Studios had become one of the United States' largest production studios outside of Hollywood. Many artists had also leased space and established an association called Brooklyn Navy Yard Arts. Branding agency CO OP Brand Co had been hired to rebrand the area.

The redevelopment of Admiral's Row was ultimately approved in 2015; as part of the plan, most of Admiral's Row would be demolished and redeveloped. The 250,000-square-foot Green Manufacturing Center, inside former building 128, was completed in 2016. Dock 72, a 675,000-square-foot office building, topped out in October 2017 and houses offices for WeWork, a co-working space. Construction on 399 Sands Street, a manufacturing complex on the site of Admiral's Row, started in June 2018, and it is expected to open in 2021. An adjacent Wegmans supermarket opened in 2019, along with part of 399 Sands' parking lot.

During the 2016 Democratic presidential primaries, Hillary Clinton and Bernie Sanders held a debate at Brooklyn Navy Yard in building 268, the Duggal Greenhouse. Clinton later held her victory party at the Navy Yard once she received the party's nomination.

In January 2018, the Brooklyn Navy Yard Development Corporation released an updated master plan with an estimated cost of $2.5 billion. An additional  of space would be added at Brooklyn Navy Yard; most of this would be manufacturing space, but a small portion of the space in each new building would be dedicated to office uses. This space, to be built as part of a new technology hub, would be able to accommodate 13,000 extra workers, and would roughly double the amount of manufacturing and office space within the Navy Yard. In fall 2018, the Brooklyn Navy Yard Development Corporation and architectural firm WXY divulged further details about the master plan. The Brooklyn Navy Yard would include several vertical-manufacturing buildings, and various locations within the Navy Yard would be redeveloped to integrate it with the surrounding community. The development would be concentrated at three sites on Navy Street and Flushing and Kent Avenues. That December, the development corporation started soliciting applications to renovate the last undeveloped pier at the Brooklyn Navy Yard.

Description 

The Brooklyn Navy Yard has five piers labeled C, D, G, J, and K from west to east, with ten berths in total. Adjacent to the piers is a homeport for the NYC Ferry system.

The Navy Yard also contains six dry docks, numbered 1, 4, 2, 3, 5, and 6 from west to east. The drydocks are now operated by GMD Shipyard Corp. Since at least the 1920s, a federal project maintains a channel depth of 35 ft (10 m) from Throggs Neck to the yard, about two miles (3 km) from the western entrance, and thence 40 ft (12 m) to deep water in the Upper Bay.

Geographically, the Brooklyn Navy Yard is located at the western end of Long Island. It surrounds Wallabout Bay, a former tidal marsh on the southeastern shore of the East River, a tidal estuary that connects to Long Island Sound on the east and the New York Bay to the south. The bay, in turn, is located at a bend of the river just south of the Williamsburg Bridge, where the river turns from a southward alignment to a westward alignment. The surrounding area is located near the northeast tip of the Atlantic coastal plain, a flat, low-lying physiographic region that extends to the southern United States. The area was formerly fed by Wallabout Creek, which flowed downhill from the hilly terminal moraine in the center of Long Island and drained into a low, small area before reaching Wallabout Bay. This resulted in the mud flats that formerly were prevalent in Brooklyn Navy Yard, though the shipyard site straddles the geographical boundary between mud flats and tidal marshland.

The Brooklyn Navy Yard's streets are not shown on any official city maps, as all of its roads are privately maintained. The address for the entire Navy Yard is given as 63 Flushing Avenue. The Brooklyn Navy Yard can be accessed via gates at Sands/Navy Streets, Cumberland Street/Flushing Avenue, Clinton/Flushing Avenues, and Kent Avenue/Clymer Street. A brick wall used to encircle the Navy Yard, separating it from the Farragut Houses and Vinegar Hill to the west; Fort Greene to the south; and Williamsburg to the east.

Transportation
Transportation to Brooklyn Navy Yard is provided by the MTA's  bus, which makes stops inside the yard. The  buses stop along the yard's perimeter. A self-driving shuttle van service operating exclusively within Brooklyn Navy Yard was expected to start running in mid-2019.

A NYC Ferry stop was initially planned to open in Brooklyn Navy Yard in 2018. A stop along NYC Ferry's Astoria route at Dock 72 was included in a NYC Ferry expansion announced in January 2019, and the NYC Ferry stop ultimately opened as scheduled on May 20, 2019. The Brooklyn Navy Yard also houses NYC Ferry's homeport, where the system's fleet is maintained.

Shuttle bus service
Since 2016, the Brooklyn Navy Yard Development Corporation has operated two complimentary shuttle bus services for Navy Yard tenants and their guests. The services utilize 30-foot Grande West Vicinity and Freightliner cutaways.

Notable structures

Brooklyn Naval Hospital

The Brooklyn Naval Hospital was established in 1825 on a site that was not initially contiguous with the main Navy Yard. A main building was completed in 1838, and was subsequently expanded with several wings, including two permanent wings built in 1840 that still exist. A two-story Surgeon's House was built in 1863. More structures were added in the early 20th century, including a medical supply depot, a lumber shed, and quarters buildings. The hospital also operated a cemetery from 1831 to 1910, when the cemetery reached its burial capacity. In 1948, the hospital was decommissioned and most of its functions were relocated to other facilities.

In 2012, Steiner Studios proposed to build a media campus at the former hospital site as an annex to its existing campus at the Navy Yard. A park on the hospital cemetery's site, the Naval Cemetery Landscape, was opened in May 2016. At the time, Steiner Studios was planning to restore the hospital buildings starting in 2017, and restoration was expected to take nearly a decade.

Brooklyn Navy Yard Center (Building 92)
The original Building 92, built in 1857 and designed by Thomas Ustick Walter, is the former U.S. Marine Commandant's quarters. Building 92 is the only remnant of the  U.S. Marine Barrack Grounds along Flushing Avenue. The grounds was built on land acquired in 1848 and included marine officers' quarters, a barracks (former Building 91), a gate house, and a central parade ground. All of these buildings were constructed in the Greek Revival style. Building 92 used to have a nearly identical counterpart, Building 93, which was demolished in 1941 to make way for a warehouse.

The former U.S. Marine Commandant's residence is now part of a museum dedicated to the shipyard, the Brooklyn Navy Yard Center at Building 92. Building 92 was renovated and expanded by Beyer Blinder Belle in 2011 at a cost of $25 million. The Brooklyn Navy Yard Center opened in November 2011 as a program of the Brooklyn Navy Yard Development Corporation. The center offers exhibits, public tours, educational programs, archival resources, and workforce development services. The museum's main exhibit focuses on the history of the Brooklyn Navy Yard and its impact on American industry, technology, innovation, and manufacturing, as well as on national and New York City's labor, politics, education, and urban and environmental planning. The building also hosts displays and videos about the new businesses in the facility. Plans for a museum dedicated to the Brooklyn Navy Yard date to 1975, though the museum was originally proposed to be located in a different building.

The center contains a  annex with a laser-cut metal facade. The annex is connected to the original house via a 3-story lobby. The lobby includes a  steel anchor from the amphibious assault ship Austin (1964).

Dry docks 
The Brooklyn Navy Yard consists of six dry docks located along the Brooklyn Navy Yard's northern edge, along the East River. Dry Dock 1 was the first one to be completed. This was followed by Dry Dock 2 in 1887, Dry Dock 3 in 1897, Dry Dock 4 in 1913, and Dry Docks 5 and 6 in 1941. Dry Docks 1, 5, and 6 are the only dry docks that remain in service.

Dry Dock 1 

Dry Dock 1 is located at Wallabout Bay, on the northeast side of Brooklyn Navy Yard. Completed in 1851, it is the third-oldest dry dock in the United States, behind the dry docks at the Boston and Norfolk Navy Yards. Dry Dock 1 is the smallest of the Navy Yard's dry docks. The first permanent dry dock in New York City, it cost $2 million to construct.

Dry Dock 1's masonry superstructure uses  of granite from Maine and Connecticut, as well as supplementary material from New York. The center of the floor is mostly flat, with a  groove. Steps lead down the sides of the dry dock. At the seaward end of the dock is a gate that floats open without the use of hinges. The pumping engine built for this drydock was the largest in the U.S. at one time.

Surveying for the dry dock began in 1826, though funding was not provided until 1836. Construction on the dry dock started in 1841, but was halted a year later because of a lack of funding. During this time, there were debates over whether to abandon work on this dry dock and construct another in Manhattan, where the new Croton Aqueduct had just opened. When construction resumed in 1844, the project was led by two civil engineers in quick succession until William J. McAlpine was appointed to the position in 1846. At the time, the project was beset by several problems, including the presence of quicksand and underground springs, as well as a faulty cofferdam design that twice flooded the excavation site with water from Wallabout Bay. The cofferdam was fixed by installing deep foundations made of gravel at the outermost cofferdam. The springs were covered with a mixture of piles, planks and dry cement under a layer of brick and Roman mortar. In 1847 after the wooden piles were completed, the stonecutter Thorton MacNess Niven oversaw the installation of the dry dock's masonry superstructure.

McAlpine was fired for unknown reasons in 1849, and Charles B. Stuart took over for the rest of the project. Dry Dock 1 serviced its first ship, Dale, in 1850. The dry dock was completed the following year. Because of its design, Dry Dock 1 never required any extensive maintenance, though part of the masonry at the front of the dry dock was refurbished in 1887–1888. Dry Dock 1 was labeled a NYC Landmark in 1975.

Timber shed 
The Brooklyn Navy Yard's timber shed (Building 16), constructed between 1833 and 1853, is one of the Brooklyn Navy Yard's oldest buildings, behind the 1806 commandant's house and the 1838 Naval Hospital building. It is a brick building with a gable roof located on the west side of the Brooklyn Navy Yard, adjoining Navy Street. The timber shed had a twin, Building 15, which was located directly to the north and is now demolished. Building 16 originally measured  while Building 15 measured . Both buildings were used to store wood for shipbuilding after it had been cured in the nearby mill pond. Documents from 1837 suggest that the United States Navy allocated almost $90,000 on the construction of up to four brick timber sheds at Brooklyn Navy Yard.

After the Civil War, the timber sheds were used for timber storage, though the number of wooden ships built at the Navy Yard steadily decreased. During the late 19th century, Admiral's Row, a grouping of residences that formerly housed Navy Yard officers, was built around the timber sheds. As part of a Works Progress Administration renovation, part of Building 15 was demolished in 1937. In the 1940s, Building 16 was used as a police station as well as a lumber storage building, and in the 1950s and 1960s, it was also used as a garage. A 1963 renovation to Building 16 demolished part of the building, and the remainder was converted into a private ice rink for police officers. The rest of Building 15 was demolished probably after 1979, and Building 16 was abandoned around this time.

By 2010, Building 16 had been proposed for redevelopment, although it had badly deteriorated. In early 2011, engineers for the National Guard Bureau recommended demolishing the structure, since refurbishing it would cost $40 million. The refurbishment of the timber shed was underway by 2018. Douglas C. Steiner, who was redeveloping the Admiral's Row site, stated in January 2018 that Building 16 would likely be developed for food-related uses, such as for a restaurant.

Sands Street gate 

The gate at Sands Street, on the Brooklyn Navy Yard's western border, was the main entrance to the yard in the early 20th century. It consists of a one-story medieval-style gatehouse shaped like a castle, with plinths, turrets, and posts with eagles on the tops. This entrance is located at the intersection of Sands Street and Navy Street, close to Admiral's Row, and was surrounded by the two timber sheds there. A wooden footbridge above the gate, built after World War II, formerly connected the two sheds. The gatehouse has undergone modifications throughout the years, including the addition of second and third floors (since removed), and the removal of the turrets. At one point, the Sands Street gate featured a failed hand-cranked submarine design called the Intelligent Whale, as well as Trophy Park, which contained a memorial shaft to twelve American sailors killed during the Battle of Canton in 1856.

The Sands Street gate replaced another gate on nearby York Street, and it cost $20,000 or $24,000 to build. As originally proposed in 1893, the gatehouse was supposed to be a 4-story structure containing a peaked roof, crenelations, and an ornate facade. However, the gatehouse was downsized to its current design because the other proposal was too expensive. Fearing a loss of business, saloon keepers on York Street protested against the Sands Street gate's construction, to no avail.

The gate started construction in 1895, and it opened a year later. The new Sands Street gate was not only closer to the trolley lines on Flushing Avenue, but also avoided a dirty and "malodorous" vicinity around the York Street gate. A year after the gate's opening, the Brooklyn Daily Eagle noted that the vicinity of the Sands Street gate was "much appreciated by the young women of Brooklyn who are enthusiastic Navy Yard visitors." Saloons soon opened up around this gate, and by 1924, sailors were banned from using the entrance. Starting with the Spanish–American War and continuing through both major world wars, potential Navy applicants lined up outside the Sands Street gate to enlist in the Navy. Sometime after the Navy Yard was decommissioned, the Sands Street gate became the entrance to the NYPD's Brooklyn tow pound, and by 2004, there were plans to refurbish the gate. The gatehouse was restored to its original condition in 2012, and it has housed the Kings County Distillery's tasting room since 2015.

Supply storehouse 

The Brooklyn Navy Yard's eleven-story supply storehouse (Building 3), located east of Building 92, was the first reinforced-concrete building constructed at the yard. Built by Turner Construction in the Neo-Classical style, it contains a one-story base and one-story attic with nine stories in between. A loading platform, covered by a flat metal canopy, encircles the building's base, and contains loading dock entries at various points. There were also formerly rail sidings on the west and north sides of the building. The nine stories above the base contain columns of wide rectangular windows, organized into "bays". Each bay is separated by concrete piers, and each window contains a concrete still below it. There are cornices at the top of the tenth and eleventh floors. On the eleventh floor, each bay contains triple-windows, and there are stair and elevator bulkhead structures, as well as skylights. The structure contained  of floor space when first built.

The federal government had commissioned Turner Construction by chance, when government officials raided Turner's factory based on a report of German guns being manufactured, and found Turner manufacturing engine foundations instead. A contract for Building 3's construction was made in April 1917. Work began four days after the contract was signed. The modification to 11 stories was made partway through the construction progress. Construction progressed at a pace of one story per week, aided by the proximity of the Navy Yard's railroad system, via which materials could be delivered. The structure was finished by September at a cost of $1.2 million, and the Navy moved into the structure on October 1, 1917. The attic contained the commandant's, yard captain's, and manager's offices. Building 3 was outfitted with radio and radar laboratories during World War II, and footbridges were constructed to Buildings 5 and 77, although both footbridges have since been demolished. The roof of Building 3 now contains a rooftop farm run by Brooklyn Grange, and the rest of the building is occupied by various industrial and commercial tenants.

Building 77 
Building 77 is a sixteen-story structure constructed during World War II based on a design by George T. Basset. The structure contains  of floor space. The foundation of the building is supported by caissons of concrete and steel, which descend  underground. The lowest eleven stories were constructed with  walls and no windows, encompassing  of storage space. These floors were likely used to store ammunition. Windows were installed on these floors in a 2017 renovation of the building.

In mid-1940, Turner Construction was hired to erect the building under a cost-plus-fixed-fee contract, which would expedite construction. The foundation of the building was constructed in June 1941, and construction progressed quickly, with one story completed roughly every three working days. The structure was completed by September 1941 at a cost of $4 million. The structure originally contained the yard headquarters as well as other spaces such as offices, storage spaces, laboratories, and a library. Building 77 was renovated in 2017 by Beyer Blinder Belle and now houses light manufacturing as well as commercial tenants.

Other notable structures 
 The commandant's house, Quarters A (built 1807), is a federal style structure in Vinegar Hill that is a part of Admiral's Row. Charles Bulfinch, who also designed the United States Capitol's rotunda, is often named as the architect of this house, though there is no evidence that Bulfinch was actually involved in the design.
 Building 1 (former Building 291, built  1941-1942) was a materials testing laboratory, used for testing electronic output during World War II. The roof contains radio towers erected during World War II, which still exist. It was used by the Navy even after the yard's decommissioning and was abandoned in 1994. It is now used by Steiner Studios.
 Building 5 (built 1920), located north of Building 3, is a six-story brick rectangular structure with penthouse. It was used as a light machine shop, an electrical and ordnance structure, and a radio station and laboratory at different points in its history.
 Building 41 (built 1942), located on Morris Avenue between Fourth and Fifth Street, was originally a power plant, replacing another on the same site. It was converted into a cogeneration plant in 1995, using one of the world's largest cranes.
 Building 128 (built  1899-1900) is located at Morris Avenue and Sixth Street, near the Cumberland Street entrance. The building is a one-story L-shaped structure made of steel, masonry, and glass, and a high gable-monitor roof. It was formerly a machine and erecting shop, with the long arm of the L pointing northeast to accommodate a long movable crane. Building 128 now houses the Green Manufacturing Center.
 Building 132 (built 1905), located at Warrington Avenue and Fourth Street, was formerly a steam engine repair shop, and now contains light manufacturing.
 Building 280 (built 1942) is located at Morris Avenue and Sixth Street, near the Cumberland Street entrance. It is an eight-story rectangular structure that was formerly used as an ordnance machine shop.
 Building 293 (built  1970s) is located northeast of Dry Dock 6, on the northeast side of the yard. It is an  gable-roofed structure that served as a supply and distribution center. Building 293 was supposed to be a paint fabrication facility for Seatrain Shipbuilding, but the permits were never granted. The building was then converted into a modular apartment manufacturing facility for Forest City Ratner (and later for FullStack Modular), which produced apartments for the nearby Pacific Park development. In 2016, Building 293 was outfitted with one of New York City's largest solar roof installations, a 3,152-panel structure that could generate  of energy.

Former structures
Admiral's Row featured ten homes in various architectural styles (namely the Greek Revival, Italianate, and French Empire styles). Built between 1864 and 1901, they served as residences to high-ranking Navy Yard officers. The property also contained a timber shed, parade ground, tennis courts, and garages attached to each house. The row was abandoned when the Navy Yard was decommissioned in 1966, and most of the houses were demolished in 2016.

The Brooklyn Navy Yard also contained an artificial island called the Cob Dock. It was originally a mud flat in Wallabout Bay and was reportedly expanded with ballast released by departing ships. Cob Dock became a convenient place for ships to moor, and was once also used by the first flocks of messenger pigeons used by the Navy. Cob Dock was separated from the mainland Navy Yard by Wallabout Channel, a  channel around the southern half of the island that connected to Wallabout Bay on the west and east ends. A structural cribwork was built around the island during the Civil War, and a ship basin was built in the center of the island, while Wallabout Channel was dredged to a lower depth to allow capacity for more boats to moor. After the Civil War, the north end of the island was used to store ordnance, while the south end became a park and training ground. A ferry initially provided service between Cob Dock and the rest of the Navy Yard, but by 1900, it was replaced by a causeway across Wallabout Channel. The southern section of Cob Dock was demolished in the early 1910s to make room for larger ships. The remainder of the island was demolished during World War II to make room for Dry Docks 5 and 6, which were built in 1942.

The Wallabout Market, a city-operated food market formerly located at the eastern end of the Brooklyn Navy Yard, was developed in the late 19th century. The United States Navy Department started leasing  of waterfront land to the city of Brooklyn in 1877 so that the city could start operating a market, and the Navy received a permit to start operating the market in 1884. The Brooklyn city government gained ownership of Wallabout Market in 1890, and the market later came under the operation of New York City. The market was very close to New York Harbor, so it was easy to import and export goods, but the ground was muddy and the area was frequented by a violent gang that evaded police enforcement. Roads, frame buildings, and a sewage system were installed at Wallabout Market. By the late 1890s, the market contained piers, as well as floating landings for the Delaware, Lackawanna and Western Railroad and the Pennsylvania Railroad. The Wallabout Market site was re-acquired by the Navy and demolished during World War II to make room for Dry Docks 5 and 6.

Landmark designations

In 2014, the entire yard was listed on the National Register of Historic Places (NRHP) as a historic district. Certain buildings have also been given landmark status. Quarters A, the commander's quarters building, is a National Historic Landmark. Dry Dock 1, the Navy Yard Hospital Building (R95), and the Surgeon's Residence (R1) inside the Brooklyn Naval Hospital are all New York City designated landmarks.

A report commissioned by the National Guard in 2008 suggested that the entirety of the Admiral's Row property met the eligibility criteria for inclusion on the NRHP. However, in 2010, Admiral's Row sparked a landmarks debate because it had deteriorated to the point of collapse. Ultimately, the city approved a plan to redevelop Admiral's Row. In 2016, nine of the ten historic houses on Admiral's Row were torn down to accommodate 399 Sands Street, the Wegmans supermarket, and the parking lot.

A bronze marker on the Brooklyn Bridge contains a section commemorating the history of the shipyard. The plaque mentions several of the notable ships that were built at Brooklyn Navy Yard, including the Maine; the Missouri; and the last ship constructed there, Duluth.

Commandants

 Lieutenant Jonathan Thorn, June 1, 1806 – July 13, 1807
 Captain Isaac Chauncey, July 13, 1807 – May 16, 1813
 Captain Samuel Evans, May 16, 1813 – June 2, 1824
 Commander George W. Rodgers, June 2, 1824 – December 21, 1824
 Captain Isaac Chauncey, December 21, 1824 – June 10, 1833
 Captain Charles G. Ridgeley, June 10, 1833 – November 19, 1839
 Captain James Renshaw, November 19, 1839 – June 12, 1841
 Captain Matthew C. Perry, June 12, 1841 – July 15, 1843
 Captain Silas H. Stringham, July 15, 1843 – October 1, 1846
 Captain Isaac McKeever, October 1, 1846 – October 1, 1849
 Captain William D. Salter, October 1, 1849 – October 14, 1852
 Captain Charles Boardman, October 14, 1852 – October 1, 1855
 Captain Abraham Bigelow, October 1, 1855 – June 8, 1857
 Captain Lawrence Kearny, June 8, 1857 – November 1, 1858
 Captain Samuel L. Breese, November 1, 1858 – October 25, 1861
 Captain Hiram Paulding, October 25, 1861 – May 1, 1865
 Commodore Charles H. Bell, May 1, 1865 – May 1, 1868
 Rear Admiral Sylvanus W. Godon, May 1, 1868 – October 15, 1870
 Rear Admiral Melancton Smith, October 15, 1870 – June 1, 1872
 Vice Admiral Stephen Clegg Rowan, June 1, 1872 – September 1, 1876
 Commodore James W. Nicholson, September 1, 1876 – May 1, 1880
 Commodore George H. Cooper, May 1, 1880 – April 1, 1882
 Commodore John H. Upshur, April 1, 1882 – March 31, 1884
 Commodore Thomas S. Fillebrown, March 31, 1884 – December 31, 1884
 Commodore Ralph Chandler, December 31, 1884 – October 15, 1886
 Commodore Bancroft Gherardi, October 15, 1886 – February 15, 1889
 Captain Francis M. Ramsay, February 15, 1889 – November 14, 1889
 Rear Admiral Daniel L. Braine, November 14, 1889 – May 20, 1891
 Commodore Henry Erben, May 20, 1891 – June 1, 1893
 Rear Admiral Bancroft Gherardi, June 1, 1893 – November 22, 1894
 Commodore Montgomery Sicard, November 22, 1894 – May 1, 1897
 Commodore Francis M. Bunce, May 1, 1897 – January 14, 1899
 Commodore John Woodward Philip, January 14, 1899 – July 17, 1900
 Rear Admiral Albert S. Barker, July 17, 1900 – April 1, 1903
 Rear Admiral Frederick Rodgers, April 1, 1903 – October 3, 1904
 Rear Admiral Joseph B. Coghlan, October 3, 1904 – June 1, 1907
 Rear Admiral Caspar F. Goodrich, June 1, 1907 – May 15, 1909
 Captain Joseph B. Murdock, May 15, 1909 – March 21, 1910
 Captain Lewis Sayre Van Duzer, April 1910 - July 1913
 Rear Admiral Eugene H. C. Leutze, March 21, 1910 – June 6, 1912
 Captain Albert Gleaves, June 6, 1912 – September 28, 1914
 Rear Admiral Nathaniel R. Usher, September 28, 1914 – February 25, 1918
 Rear Admiral John D. McDonald, September 28, 1914 – July 1, 1921
 Rear Admiral Carl T. Vogelgesang, July 1, 1921 – November 27, 1922
 Rear Admiral Charles P. Plunkett, November 27, 1922 – February 16, 1928
 Captain Frank Lyon, February 16, 1928 – July 2, 1928
 Rear Admiral Louis R. de Steiguer, July 2, 1928 – March 18, 1931
 Rear Admiral William W. Phelps, March 18, 1931 – June 30, 1933
 Rear Admiral Yates Stirling Jr., June 30, 1933 – March 9, 1936
 Captain Frederick L. Oliver, March 9, 1936 – April 20, 1936
 Rear Admiral Harris L. Laning, April 20, 1936 – September 24, 1937
 Rear Admiral Clark H. Woodward, October 1, 1937 – March 1, 1941
 Rear Admiral Edward J. Marquart, June 2, 1941 – June 2, 1943
 Rear Admiral Monroe R. Kelly, June 2, 1943 – December 5, 1944
 Rear Admiral Freeland A. Daubin, December 5, 1944 – November 25, 1945

In popular culture
Excluding the films shot at Steiner Studios, the following films, TV shows, video games, books, and cultural events are set or have been recorded at the Brooklyn Navy Yard:
 The Brooklyn Navy Yard is featured in the film On the Town (1949) starring Frank Sinatra.
 Portions of the 1986 movie Robot Holocaust were filmed at the Brooklyn Navy Yard.
 The shipyard is featured in the 2000 video game Deus Ex, as a playable level in which the protagonist must scuttle a freighter docked at the base.
 The Brooklyn Navy Yard is featured in the 2008 video game Tom Clancy's EndWar, as a playable battlefield. In the game, the yard is refitting the aircraft carrier USS Ronald Reagan into a Mobile Offshore Base.
 A Harry Houdini-themed task was performed at the Brooklyn Navy Yard in the final leg of The Amazing Race 21 (2012).
 The Brooklyn Navy Yard is prominently featured in Jennifer Egan's 2017 novel Manhattan Beach (Scribner ). The main protagonist, Anna Kerrigan, works at the Navy Yard as a parts inspector and, subsequently, as the yard's first female diver.
 ArtRave, a promotional concert hosted by the singer Lady Gaga for her album Artpop, was held at Brooklyn Navy Yard's Duggal Greenhouse on November 10 and 11, 2013.

References

Notes

Citations

Bibliography

Further reading
 
 
 Ships Constructed at the Brooklyn Navy Yard
 Inside Brooklyn Navy Yard, 2009 video essay

External links

 The Brooklyn Navy Yard Development Corporation official website
 Brooklyn Navy Yard Center at BLDG 92 official website
 
 Muster Rolls of the Officers and Men attached to the New York Navy Yard, 1813-1815, MS 93 held by Special Collections & Archives, Nimitz Library at the United States Naval Academy

 
Historic districts on the National Register of Historic Places in Brooklyn
Military facilities on the National Register of Historic Places in New York City
Neighborhoods in Brooklyn
New York (state) in the American Civil War
Shipyards on the National Register of Historic Places
United States Navy shipyards
Works Progress Administration in New York City
Military installations established in 1801
Military installations closed in 1966
Closed installations of the United States Navy
Shipyards of New York (state)
Shipyards building World War II warships